Spialia dromus, the forest sandman, dromus grizzled skipper or large grizzled skipper, is a butterfly of the family Hesperiidae. It is found in tropical Africa. In South Africa it is found along the eastern Cape coast to KwaZulu-Natal into Eswatini. It is also present in Mpumalanga and the Limpopo Province into northern Gauteng and the extreme north-west of the North West Province.

The wingspan is 23–29 mm for males and 29–32 mm for females. Adults are on wing year-round but are more common in warmer months.

The larvae feed on Triumfetta tomentosa, Triumfetta rhomboidea, Melhania and Waltheria species.

References

Spialia
Butterflies described in 1884
Butterflies of Africa